Kim Nadine Kulig-Soyah (born 9 April 1990) is a retired German footballer. She last played as a central midfielder or forward for 1. FFC Frankfurt and the German national team.

Career

Club

Kulig, born in Herrenberg, Swabia, Baden-Württemberg, started her career at age eight at SV Poltringen, where she initially played in a boys' team. In 2001, she joined SV Unterjesingen, before moving to VfL Sindelfingen two years later. She made her second Bundesliga debut at Sindelfingen, where she scored 17 goals in her first season in the country's second division. In 2008, Kulig won the Fritz Walter medal in silver as the year's second best female junior player. That year she moved to the Bundesliga side Hamburger SV. During three seasons at the club, she scored 27 goals in 59 Bundesliga appearances. From the 2011–12 season, Kulig has signed a three-year contract with 1. FFC Frankfurt.

In September 2015 she announced her retirement due to continued problems with a knee injury. She is now working with the DFB and as a soccer commentator for ZDF.

International

At age 18, Kulig reached third-place with Germany at the 2008 FIFA U-20 Women's World Cup. She made her debut for the German senior national team in February 2009 against China. Only seven months after her first international game, Kulig won the 2009 European Championship with Germany. She scored the third goal in Germany's 6–2 win over England in the final .

Kulig returned to junior competition one year later, helping Germany lift the 2010 FIFA U-20 Women's World Cup on home soil. In the tournament's final against Nigeria, Kulig hit the post which resulted in a Nigerian own goal and sealed the German 2–0 victory. Kulig was honoured as the tournament's third-best player. She has been called up for Germany's 2011 FIFA Women's World Cup squad.

During the quarter final of the 2011 FIFA Women's World Cup she was taken out in the 4th minute due to an ACL injury of the right knee. On 15 September 2012, Kulig made her comeback after 14 months of injury in the UEFA Euro 2013 Qualifiers against Kazakhstan.

International goals
Scores and results list Germany's goal tally first:

Source:

Honours

International
UEFA European Championship: Winner (1) 2009
FIFA U-20 Women's World Cup: Winner (1) 2010, Third-place (1) 2008

Individual
Fritz Walter medal: Silver 2008
Third-best player: 2010 FIFA U-20 Women's World Cup

Personal life

On May 29, 2016 Kulig married the former soccer player Melanie Soyah.

References

External links

 Profile at the German Football Association 
 

1990 births
Living people
People from Herrenberg
Sportspeople from Stuttgart (region)
German women's footballers
Germany women's international footballers
Hamburger SV (women) players
1. FFC Frankfurt players
2011 FIFA Women's World Cup players
Women's association football midfielders
Women's association football forwards
German LGBT sportspeople
LGBT association football players
UEFA Women's Championship-winning players
Footballers from Baden-Württemberg
Lesbian sportswomen